Labochilus is a Palearctic genus of potter wasps. It contains the following species:

 Labochilus bimaculatus Gusenleitner, 2001 
 Labochilus canariensis (Giordani Soika, 1974)
 Labochilus felix Guichard, 1986
 Labochilus linguarius (E. Saunders, 1905)
 Labochilus orientalis Gusenleitner, 2001 
 Labochilus pulawskyi Giordani Soika, 1970
 Labochilus rubriventris Gusenleitner, 2001

References

 Vecht, J.v.d. & J.M. Carpenter. 1990. A Catalogue of the genera of the Vespidae (Hymenoptera). Zoologische Verhandelingen 260: 3 - 62.

Biological pest control wasps
Potter wasps